Beiyuan station may refer to:

Beijing Subway
 Beiyuan station (Beijing Subway), on 
 Beiyuanlubei station, on 
 Tongzhou Beiyuan station, on

Others
 Beiyuan station (Xi'an Metro), a station on Line 2 of Xi'an Metro
 Beiyuan station (Jinan Metro), a station on Line 2 of Jinan Metro